Donald Duck's 50th Birthday is a 1984 television special broadcast on The Magical World of Disney on November 13, 1984 on CBS. As the title suggests, it was produced to celebrate the 50th anniversary of the Donald Duck character, who first appeared in the Walt Disney short The Wise Little Hen in 1934.

Donald is shown in both animated and live costumed form, interacting with emcee Dick Van Dyke and other cast members. The film not only shows Donald's life, but also depicts an extensive international tour that Donald went on in 1984. Various celebrities of the day send Donald birthday greetings, including Ed Asner, Andy Warhol, Donna Summer and the Star Wars droids. The tour culminates in a parade in Donald's honor at Disneyland.

This was the last time Clarence Nash voiced Donald Duck before his death a year later. It was rebroadcast on Disney Channel Europe on November 13, 2004 to celebrate the 20th anniversary of the special plus at the end of the special, it has the sign: "Walt Disney 1901–1966 Clarence Nash 1904–1985".

Features
 Star Wars characters R2-D2 and C-3PO explain that clarity of speech are qualities that are vital to future languages and that those who do not possess such qualities are doomed. They then add that there are exceptions to that rule, case in point, Donald's famed speech impediment, created by Clarence Nash, which they claim they know very well. C-3PO closes out this scene by saying, "Happy birthday, Mr. Duck. And Mr. Nash."
 Acclaimed artist Andy Warhol is shown finishing and hanging, The New Spirit a painting that was created for Donald's golden jubilee.
 There several scenes with Walt Disney, one with Donald Duck hiding under Disney's desk blotter despite the pleas of Disney to meet the people that had come to see him (from a Disneyland episode entitled "The Plausible Impossible"), another with Donald demonstrating the techniques of animation and sound effects and a third with Donald as a puppet with Disney was receiving a Master of Arts (the joke being that it was in fact Donald who received the degree)
 The Mickey Mouse Club theme is shown with Disney characters to illustrate Donald's innate jealousy to Mickey Mouse having his own television show. Dick Van Dyke states that Donald "never let anyone forget it".
 There is a film clip with Daisy Duck baking a cake for Donald featuring the 1980 Donald Duck song "Going Quackers" with various Donald Duck and other Disney character toys doing a dance number using stop motion animation as well as reverse acting.

1984 birthday tour

In 1984, Donald Duck (in live form) went on an international tour through Europe, Japan and parts of the United States. Some of these stops on his tour actual stage performances attended by other (live) Disney characters. Donald's arrival at airports (on his own plane depicting Donald in flight on the tailfin) was met with colossal crowds that kept getting bigger.
There were also several parades for Donald, and not just at the Disney theme parks. In one, Donald sat in a staff car in his military uniform and was promoted to the rank of sergeant. This scene was also when he was discharged from the US Army.
Donald is also shown having his footprints cast in cement at Grauman's Chinese Theatre in May 1984.

In the film, Donald's tour is shown with music as well as dialogue, assumedly added later by Clarence Nash.

Cast
Dick Van Dyke ...  Host
Edward Asner ...  Himself
Bruce Jenner  ...  Himself
Cloris Leachman ...  Herself
Kenny Rogers ...  Himself
Donna Summer ...  Herself
Andy Warhol ...  Himself
Henry Winkler ...  Himself
John Ritter ...  Himself
Anthony Daniels ...  C-3PO
Kenny Baker ...  R2-D2
Clarence Nash ...  Donald Duck / Himself
John Harlan ...  Announcer

Muppet performers
Jim Henson as Kermit the Frog
Richard Hunt as Scooter

Also featured is Walt Disney in several clips (Disney himself having died in 1966).

Featured clips
The Wise Little Hen (1934)
The Band Concert (1935)
Don Donald (1937)
Lonesome Ghosts (1937)
Donald's Nephews (1938)
Donald's Golf Game (1938, shown in French)
Donald's Better Self (1938, shown in Japanese)
The Autograph Hound (1939)
The Riveter (1940)
Mr. Duck Steps Out (1940)
Window Cleaners (1940)
The Reluctant Dragon (1941)
Old Mac Donald Duck (1941)
Der Fuehrer's Face (1942)
Donald Gets Drafted (1942)
Bellboy Donald (1942)Saludos Amigos (1942)The Three Caballeros (1944)Commando Duck (1944)Donald's Crime (1945, shown in Spanish)Fun and Fancy Free (1947)Donald's Dream Voice (1948)Bee at the Beach (1950)Canvas Back Duck (1953)Donald's Diary (1954)
"The Mickey Mouse Club" (1955)
"Disneyland: A Day in the Life of Donald Duck (#2.18)" (1956)
"Disneyland: The Plausible Impossible (#3.8)" (1956)Donald in Mathmagic Land (1959)
"Disneyland: Inside Donald Duck (#8.6)" (1961)Mickey's Christmas Carol (1983, shown in Swedish)

Soundtrack

"Happy, Happy Birthday to You (Donald Duck Version)" by Michael Silversher & Patty Silversher (1984)
"Going Quackers" (1980)
"Can You Quack Like Donald Duck?" by Michael Silversher & Patty Silversher (1984)
"Tutti Frutti" by Little Richard (1955)
"The Army's Not the Army Anymore" (first shown in the 1942 short Donald Gets Drafted)
"Donald Duck Theme" by the Disney chorusHappy, Happy Birthday to You (Donald Duck Version) was released on the Splashdance LP and cassette. Splashdance'' has since been re-released on compact disc.

Notes

References

External links
 
  Donald Duck's 50th Birthday at lucasfan.com

1980s American television specials
1984 television specials
1984 in American television
CBS television specials
Donald Duck films
Works with live action and animation
Films scored by Paul Smith (film and television composer)
Films scored by John Debney